Streptomyces tubercidicus is a bacterium species from the genus of Streptomyces which has been isolated from soil in Japan. Streptomyces tubercidicus produces tubercidin and  ascomycin.

Further reading

See also 
 List of Streptomyces species

References

External links
Type strain of Streptomyces tubercidicus at BacDive -  the Bacterial Diversity Metadatabase

tubercidicus
Bacteria described in 1961